Dollar Point is a census-designated place (CDP) in Placer County, California, United States, along the northwest shore of Lake Tahoe. It is part of the Sacramento–Arden-Arcade–Roseville Metropolitan Statistical Area. The population was 1,215 at the 2010 census down from 1,539 at the 2000 census.

History
In 1884 the Glenbrook Mills logged 337 acres on a point on Lake Tahoe. In 1898 Lake Tahoe Railway and Transportation Company (D.L. Bliss) was formed and built  of narrow gauge track into the area that became known as Dollar Point. Southern Pacific leased the track rights in 1925 and converted the tracks to Standard gauge in 1926, bought the property in 1933, and abandoned the tracks in 1943. In 1916 Lora Josephine Knight bought the point. The land was originally part of an area called Chinquapin by the Washoe Indians. Robert Dollar purchased many properties such as the 1,436 acres in Rossmoor, California and in 1927 he purchased the area that had been called  "Old Lousy", "the lousy point", and Observatory Point, from Lora Knight. She became well known for building Vikingsholm Castle in 1929. She and her husband were also primary financial backers of Charles Lindbergh's non-stop solo flight across the Atlantic.

Dollar Point is located within the Sierra Nevada Mountain Range on the Northwest corner of Lake Tahoe. Carnelian Bay is on the north side, Tahoe City to the south, and Tahoe National Forest and Burton Creek State Park extends along the entire east side. State Route 28 is the only major highway access to the area and runs the length of the northwest boundary of Dollar Point. Dollar also purchased a react of land to the east of SR 28 that is now called Chinquapin development.

Geography
Dollar Point is located at  (39.188639, -120.108848).

Dollar Creek flows along the northern boundary of the area (that also contains Dollar reservoir) and Burton Creek flows along the southern boundary.

Demographics

2010
At the 2010 census Dollar Point had a population of 1,215. The racial makeup of Dollar Point was 1,145 (94.2%) White, 4 (0.3%) African American, 6 (0.5%) Native American, 19 (1.6%) Asian, 0 (0.0%) Pacific Islander, 24 (2.0%) from other races, and 17 (1.4%) from two or more races. Hispanic or Latino of any race were 83 people (6.8%).

The whole population lived in households, no one lived in non-institutionalized group quarters and no one was institutionalized.

There were 571 households, 109 (19.1%) had children under the age of 18 living in them, 248 (43.4%) were opposite-sex married couples living together, 33 (5.8%) had a female householder with no husband present, 16 (2.8%) had a male householder with no wife present.  There were 41 (7.2%) unmarried opposite-sex partnerships, and 2 (0.4%) same-sex married couples or partnerships. 193 households (33.8%) were one person and 59 (10.3%) had someone living alone who was 65 or older. The average household size was 2.13.  There were 297 families (52.0% of households); the average family size was 2.69.

The age distribution was 188 people (15.5%) under the age of 18, 91 people (7.5%) aged 18 to 24, 321 people (26.4%) aged 25 to 44, 419 people (34.5%) aged 45 to 64, and 196 people (16.1%) who were 65 or older.  The median age was 45.4 years. For every 100 females, there were 108.0 males.  For every 100 females age 18 and over, there were 106.2 males.

There were 1,822 housing units at an average density of 1,115.1 per square mile, of the occupied units 363 (63.6%) were owner-occupied and 208 (36.4%) were rented. The homeowner vacancy rate was 5.4%; the rental vacancy rate was 14.3%.  764 people (62.9% of the population) lived in owner-occupied housing units and 451 people (37.1%) lived in rental housing units.

2000
At the 2000 census there were 1,539 people, 681 households, and 388 families in the CDP. The racial makeup of the CDP was 96.04% White, 0.32% Black or African American, 0.45% Native American, 1.30% Asian, 0.06% Pacific Islander, 1.04% from other races, and 0.78% from two or more races.  2.60% of the population were Hispanic or Latino of any race.
Of the 681 households 22.3% had children under the age of 18 living with them, 46.7% were married couples living together, 7.5% had a female householder with no husband present, and 43.0% were non-families. 27.0% of households were one person and 5.4% were one person aged 65 or older.  The average household size was 2.26 and the average family size was 2.67.

The age distribution was 17.0% under the age of 18, 8.1% from 18 to 24, 32.2% from 25 to 44, 30.3% from 45 to 64, and 12.4% 65 or older.  The median age was 41 years. For every 100 females, there were 106.3 males.  For every 100 females age 18 and over, there were 103.7 males.

The median household income was $47,500 and the median family income  was $56,792. Males had a median income of $40,000 versus $25,905 for females. The per capita income for the CDP was $32,882.  About 1.5% of families and 8.2% of the population were below the poverty line, including none of those under age 18 and 4.9% of those age 65 or over.

References

Census-designated places in Placer County, California
Lake Tahoe
Census-designated places in California